Hsieh Su-wei was the defending champion, having won the event in 2012, but decided not to participate in 2013.

Zhang Yuxuan won the tournament, defeating Wang Qiang in the final, 1–6, 7–6(7–4), 6–2.

Seeds

Main draw

Finals

Top half

Bottom half

References 
 Main draw

Wenshan - Singles